The Magazine of Poetry and Literary Review began publication in 1889 in Buffalo, New York under the editorship of, and published by, Charles Wells Moulton. Other editors included Nettie Leila Michel. It is sometimes cited as The Magazine of Poetry, because that is what appeared on its headers. Some volumes have been reprinted in the 21st century.

Publication history

References

1889 establishments in New York (state)
1895 disestablishments in New York (state)
Poetry magazines published in the United States
Defunct literary magazines published in the United States
English-language magazines
Magazines established in 1889
Magazines disestablished in 1895
Magazines published in New York (state)
Mass media in Buffalo, New York